The Miss Universe Germany 2009 pageant was held on July 5, 2009. This year only 7 candidates were competing for the national crown. Each delegate represents a states and regions of the country. The chosen winner will represent Germany at the Miss Universe 2009. The winner of best national costume, the costume will be use in Miss Universe 2009.

Final Results

Official Delegates

External links
Official Website

2009
2009 in Germany
2009 beauty pageants
Dortmund